Sergio Antonio Jáuregui Landivar (born March 13, 1985) is a Bolivian former professional footballer who played as a defender.

Club career
Jáuregui was born in Santa Cruz de la Sierra. He began playing professionally for Blooming in 2002. His good form with club and national team rewarded him with a transfer to Swiss team Yverdon-Sport FC in the second semester of 2005 on a loan; however, he did not overcome the adaptation process and returned to Bolivia the following year, after making only three appearances for Yverdon. At his arrival, he was loaned to The Strongest for a six-month period. For the 2007 season, he rejoined the celestes.

On August 24, 2009 during a league match, Jáuregui was red carded together with Leonardo Medina of Oriente Petrolero after a clash. While leaving the field, he ran towards Medina and performed a side kick him on his face. After the incident Medina was taken to a hospital. Jauregui was banned to play in Bolivia for nine months and charged with assault. On June 10, 2010 Jauregui made his official comeback with the team after his suspension was completed. In January 2011 he transferred to San José.

International career
Between 2004 and 2005, Jáuregui earned 13 caps for the Bolivia national team. He represented his country in nine FIFA World Cup qualification matches.

References

External links
 
 
 

1985 births
Living people
Sportspeople from Santa Cruz de la Sierra
Bolivian footballers
Association football defenders
Bolivia international footballers
Club Blooming players
Yverdon-Sport FC players
The Strongest players
Club San José players
Bolivian expatriate footballers
Bolivian expatriate sportspeople in Switzerland
Expatriate footballers in Switzerland